Lithobius forficatus, most commonly known as the brown centipede or stone centipede, is a common European centipede of the family Lithobiidae, although its distribution is not exclusive to Europe. It is between 18 and 30 mm long and up to 4 mm broad and is a chestnut brown color.

It is similar to a variety of other European lithobiid centipedes, particularly the striped centipede, Lithobius variegatus, but L. forficatus does not have stripes on its legs. Like most lithobiids, it is found in the upper layers of soil, particularly under rocks and rotting logs. This species can be fairly easily identified by its reaction to being revealed, which is to run extremely quickly for cover. This is different from many of the other species of large lithobiid, which tend to be less extreme in their evasion behavior.

It is a predator, and its main diet consists of insects and invertebrates, including spiders, slugs, worms and flies. It has specially-adapted front legs which have evolved to resemble 'fangs' and they contain venom that allows the centipede to overpower its prey.

Lifecycle 
Lithobiids leave the egg with seven pairs of legs, and each time they molt, they develop additional body segments with a new pair of legs on each. An adult will have a maximum of 15 pairs of legs.

Lithobius forficatus may live for as long as five to six years.

References

External links

 

forficatus
Animals described in 1758
Myriapods of Europe
Taxa named by Carl Linnaeus